Augy may refer to the following places in France:

Augy, Aisne, a commune in the department of Aisne
Augy, Yonne, a commune in the department of Yonne
Augy-sur-Aubois, a commune in the department of Cher